Lagot Ka... Isusumbong Kita! is a Philippine television situational comedy series broadcast by GMA Network. Starring Joey Marquez, Benjie Paras, Richard Gomez, and Raymart Santiago it premiered on October 20, 2003 on the network's KiliTV line up. The series concluded on April 9, 2007 with a total of 182 episodes.

The series is streaming online on YouTube.

Cast and characters

Lead cast
 Richard Gomez as Ric
 Joey Marquez as Tsong
 Benjie Paras as Junior
 Raymart Santiago as Toto

Supporting cast
 Pilita Corrales as Rosa/Mamita
 Maureen Larrazabal as Tisay
 Alicia Mayer as Sussy
 Bearwin Meily as Tom
 Toni Gonzaga as Toni
 Nancy Castiglione as Trisha
 Teri Onor as Romeo
 Vangie Labalan as Tusha
 Alyssa Alano as Shirley
 Gladys Guevarra as Lyn Chin
 Cogie Domingo as Kiko

References

External links
 

2003 Philippine television series debuts
2007 Philippine television series endings
Filipino-language television shows
GMA Network original programming
Philippine comedy television series